Balvano is a small city and a commune in the province of Potenza (Basilicata, southern Italy).

The recent history of Balvano is connected to several catastrophes. In 1944, a steam train stalled in a nearby railway tunnel, suffocating 426 passengers. It was also one of the towns nearly destroyed by the 1980 Irpinia earthquake.

Cities and towns in Basilicata